The 1956–57 season of the Eredivisie was the first in its history. It was the start of a single professional football competition in the Netherlands, represented by the country's best clubs. It was contested by 18 teams, and Ajax won the championship.

League standings

Results

See also
 1956–57 Eerste Divisie
 1956–57 Tweede Divisie

References

 RSSSF

Eredivisie seasons
1956–57 in Dutch football
Neth